Vitinho may refer to:

Vitinho (footballer, born 1989), full name Victor da Silva Medeiros, Brazilian former footballer
Vitinho (footballer, born 1990), full name Victor Hugo Machado Maia Mesquita, Brazilian football midfielder
Vitinho (footballer, born May 1993), full name Victor Guilherme dos Santos Carvalho, Brazilian football forward
Vitinho (footballer, born October 1993), full name Victor Vinícius Coelho dos Santos, Brazilian football attacking midfielder
Vitinho (footballer, born March 1998), full name Victor Hugo Santana Carvalho, Brazilian football midfielder
Vitinho (footballer, born September 1998), full name João Victor Souza dos Santos, Brazilian football forward
Vitinho (footballer, born April 1999), full name Vitor Hugo Naum dos Santos, Brazilian football forward
Vitinho (footballer, born July 1999), full name Victor Alexander da Silva, Brazilian football defender
Vitinho (footballer, born January 2000), full name Victor Gabriel Moura de Oliveira, Brazilian football midfielder
Vitinho (footballer, born December 2000), full name Victor Julio Alves de Paula, Brazilian football midfielder